William Patterson (15 September 1888 – 17 September 1956) was an Australian rules footballer who played for the St Kilda Football Club in the Victorian Football League (VFL).

Patterson made 11 appearances for St Kilda, with the only win coming against University. Following his retirement from football, Patterson became head trainer of St Kilda and during the 1938 VFL season he took over from Ansell Clarke as coach of St Kilda for a game against North Melbourne at Arden Street. St Kilda lost 12.11 (83) to 7.15 (57).

References

Holmesby, Russell and Main, Jim (2007). The Encyclopedia of AFL Footballers. 7th ed. Melbourne: Bas Publishing.

1888 births
1956 deaths
St Kilda Football Club players
St Kilda Football Club coaches
Australian rules footballers from Victoria (Australia)